The Lesotho women's national cricket team represents the country of Lesotho in women's cricket matches.

In April 2018, the International Cricket Council (ICC) granted full Women's Twenty20 International (WT20I) status to all its members. Therefore, all Twenty20 matches played between Lesotho women and another international side after 1 July 2018 were a full WT20I.

Lesotho's first WT20I matches were contested as part of the Botswana 7s tournament in August 2018 against Botswana, Malawi, Mozambique, Namibia, Sierra Leone and Zambia (Zambia's matches were not classified as WT20Is as they had a Botswanan player in their squad). Lesotho finished bottom of the table, losing all five group matches and lose the fifth place play off against Malawi by a margin of nine wickets.

Records and Statistics 

International Match Summary — Lesotho Women
 
Last Updated 25 August 2018

Twenty20 International 

 Highest team total: 87 (19.1 Overs) v Mozambique, 21 August 2018, at Botswana Cricket Association Oval 2, Gaborone.
 Highest individual score: 31*, Matsooana Tsarsi v Malawi, 21 August 2018, at Botswana Cricket Association Oval 2, Gaborone.
 Best individual bowling figures: 2/12, Tanki Ramabitsa v Mozambique, 21 August 2018, at Botswana Cricket Association Oval 2, Gaborone.

T20I record versus other nations

Records complete to WT20I #488. Last updated 25 August 2018.

See also
 List of Lesotho women Twenty20 International cricketers

References

Women's
Women's national cricket teams
Cricket